Brachyglene caenea is a moth of the family Notodontidae first described by Dru Drury in 1782. It is restricted
to south-eastern Brazil, from Rio de Janeiro south to Santa Catarina.

Description
Antennae black and setaceous. Thorax and abdomen nearly black. Wings deep brown, nearly black; the anterior having a yellow band crossing them from the anterior edges to the lower corners; and the posterior having a broad yellow streak on the anterior edges. Margins of the wings entire. Wingspan  inches (70 mm).

References

Moths described in 1782
Notodontidae of South America
Descriptions from Illustrations of Exotic Entomology